Bill Ogilvie (1932–2011) was a Scottish football player and manager.

References

External links 

1932 births
2011 deaths
Association football central defenders
Scottish Football League players
Scottish Football League managers
Scottish footballers
Scottish football managers
Forfar Athletic F.C. players
Montrose F.C. players
Montrose F.C. managers
People from Kirriemuir
Footballers from Angus, Scotland